New Dimensions is a studio album by the American vocal trio The Three Degrees. Released in 1978, the album was produced by Giorgio Moroder and yielded three UK Top 20 hit singles, "Giving Up, Giving In" (UK No. 12), "Woman in Love" (UK No. 3), and "The Runner" (UK No. 10). The album peaked at No. 34 in the UK Album Chart in early 1979.

The rights to the Ariola Records back catalogue are now held by Sony BMG Music Entertainment. New Dimensions has been released on compact disc in Japan in 2008, and was released on compact disc in the UK in 2010 by BBR Records with seven bonus tracks.

Track listing 

Side A:
 "Giving Up, Giving In" (Giorgio Moroder, Pete Belotte) - 6:07
 "Falling in Love Again" (Giorgio Moroder, Pete Belotte)  - 5:34
 "Looking for Love" (Giorgio Moroder, Pete Belotte) - 5:26

Side B:
 "The Runner" (Sheila Ferguson, Giorgio Moroder) - 6:18
 "Woman in Love" (Dominic Bugatti, Frank Musker) - 5:16
 "Magic in the Air" (Giorgio Moroder, Pete Belotte) - 5:45

Compact disc re-issue 2010 (UK)

7. "Giving Up Giving In" (7" Single version)

8. "Woman in Love" (7" Single version)

9. "The Runner" (7" Single version)

10. "Falling in Love Again" (7" Single version)

11. "Out of Love Again" (Giorgio Moroder, Pete Belotte) (B-side)

12. "The Golden Lady" (George Garvarantz, Sheila Ferguson) (OST album version from The Golden Lady)

13. "The Runner" (12" Extra Long Version)

Personnel 
 Sheila Ferguson - vocals
 Valerie Holiday - vocals
 Helen Scott - vocals

Production 
 Giorgio Moroder - producer
 Robin Branchflower, Georges Garvarentz, Del Newman - producers on CD re-issue, track 12 "The Golden Lady"
 Greg Mathieson - arranger
 Jürgen Koppers - engineer
 Bill Smith - artwork
 Gered Mankowitz - photography
 Side A recorded at Wessex Studios, London. Mixed at Musicland Studios, Munich.
 Side B recorded & mixed at Westlake & Larrebee Studio, Los Angeles.

Charts

References 

1978 albums
Disco albums by American artists
Albums produced by Giorgio Moroder
The Three Degrees albums
Ariola Records albums